Saul J. Turell (January 20, 1921 – April 10, 1986) was a producer and maker of documentaries, and a distributor for classic film.  He founded Sterling Films in 1946.  In the early sixties, Sterling Films merged with the Walter Reade Organization, becoming Reade-Sterling, of which Turell was president.

In 1965, Turell and William J. Becker took over the ailing Janus Films. The same year, Turell directed The Love Goddesses, released by Walter Reade and Paramount Pictures with the subtitle "A History of Sex in the Cinema".

He won an Academy Award in 1980 in the category Best Documentary Short Subject for Paul Robeson: Tribute to an Artist.

External links

1921 births
1986 deaths
Directors of Best Documentary Short Subject Academy Award winners
American film studio executives
20th-century American businesspeople